Jeremy Fernandez is an Australian journalist and television news presenter with the Australian Broadcasting Corporation (ABC).

Career 
Fernandez joined the Australian Broadcasting Corporation in 2000 working as a producer for ABC Local Radio. He has presented programs on Australia Network and has worked as a voice-over artist for Seven Network. He has worked with CNN International in London, UK as a writer and a producer before joining ABC again in 2009, where he continues to work at the network's Sydney bureau.

In December 2012, Fernandez replaced Felicity Davey as ABC News NSW weekend presenter.

In early 2017, Fernandez hosted Lateline while regular hosts, Tony Jones and Emma Alberici were on leave.

In December 2017, ABC announced that Fernandez would present the ABC's new late night bulletin, ABC Late News.

In May 2018, the ABC flew Fernandez and Annabel Crabb to London to host coverage of the Wedding of Prince Harry and Meghan Markle.

In August 2021, Fernandez guest hosted Media Watch after host Paul Barry was injured from a bicycle accident.

Personal life 
He was born in Malaysia and grew up there before his family migrated to Australia when he was 13. His father is an Associate Professor in journalism at Curtin University in Perth.

Fernandez has described himself as part of the LGBTQIA+ community.

Racial abuse incident

In February 2013, Fernandez was racially abused by a female fellow passenger on a Sydney bus for about 15 minutes, while taking his two-year-old daughter to child care. One other passenger intervened, but was also the recipient of remarks by the abuser. Fernandez says that the woman's daughter had been physically abusing his daughter.

Fernandez says that, after the woman and her children left the bus, other passengers offered him their names and contact details as witnesses to the incident. Fernandez later talked to the bus driver, who said he should have moved. Fernandez has described this incident as his "Rosa Parks moment".

References

External links
 Jeremy Fernandez – profile page, ABC

Living people
ABC News (Australia) presenters
Racism in Australia
Malaysian emigrants to Australia
Year of birth missing (living people)
Australian LGBT broadcasters
Australian LGBT journalists
21st-century LGBT people